Camarophyllopsis is a genus of agarics (gilled fungi) in the family Clavariaceae. Basidiocarps (fruit bodies) are dull-coloured and have dry caps, rather distant, decurrent lamellae, white spores, and smooth, ringless stems. In Europe species are characteristic of old, unimproved grasslands (termed waxcap grasslands) which are a declining habitat, making them of conservation concern.

Taxonomy

History
Camarophyllopsis was circumscribed by Czech mycologist Josef Herink in 1958, with Camarophyllopsis schulzeri as the type and only species. Roger Heim had the year previously treated this group of species under the name Hodophilus, but this was invalid because he did not include a Latin diagnosis for the genus, as was required by the rules of nomenclature at the time. Rolf Singer published Hygrotrama in March 1959 (with type species Hygrotrama dennisianum), and the name Hodophilus (type species Hodophilus foetens) was validly published in 1958.

Current Status
Previously placed in the family Hygrophoraceae based on its morphology, Camarophyllopsis was shown using molecular phylogenetics to belong in the Clavariaceae. Subsequent research has also shown that the genus Hodophilus is distinct and separate from Camarophyllopsis.

Species
 Camarophyllopsis albipes (Singer) Boertm. 2002 – Mexico
 Camarophyllopsis araguensis (Singer) Boertm. 2002 – South America
 Camarophyllopsis atrovelutina (Romagn.) Argaud 2002 - Europe
 Camarophyllopsis deceptiva (A.H. Sm. & Hesler) Bon 1996 - North America 
 Camarophyllopsis dennisiana (Singer) Arnolds 1986 - Mexico
 Camarophyllopsis hiemalis (Singer & Clémençon) Arnolds 1986 – Europe
 Camarophyllopsis lacunaris Bizio & Contu 2004 – Italy
 Camarophyllopsis leucopus (Singer) Boertm. 2002 – South America
 Camarophyllopsis microspora (A.H.Sm. & Hesler) Bon 1996 - North America
 Camarophyllopsis olivaceogrisea Ming Zhang, C.Q. Wang & T.H. Li 2019 - China
 Camarophyllopsis pedicellata (Natarajan & Manjula) Boertm. 2002 – Tamil Nadu, India
 Camarophyllopsis roseola (G.Stev.) Boertm. 2002 - New Zealand
 Camarophyllopsis rugulosoides (Hesler & A.H.Sm.) Boertm. 2002 - North America
 Camarophyllopsis schulzeri (Bres.) Herink 1958 - Europe
 Camarophyllopsis tetraspora (Singer) Raithelh. 1992 – South America

See also
List of Agaricales genera

References

Clavariaceae
Agaricales genera
Taxa named by Josef Herink
Taxa described in 1958